The Lake Champlain Transportation Company (LCTC or LCT) is a vehicle ferry operator that runs three routes across Lake Champlain between the US states of New York and Vermont. From 1976 to 2003, the company was owned by Burlington, Vermont, businessman Raymond C. Pecor Jr., who is Chairman of its board. In 2003, he sold the company to his son, Raymond Pecor III.

As such, there is no bridging of the "broad lake" north of Crown Point, New York, and south of the Rouses Point–Alburg–Swanton crossing near the Canada–United States border, though bridging of the lake near Plattsburgh has been proposed. Approximately one million passengers cross the lake by ferry each year.

Service area
Service was originally provided at three points, listed from south to north:
 Charlotte, Vermont to Essex, New York
 Burlington, Vermont to Port Kent, New York
 Grand Isle, Vermont to Plattsburgh, New York at Cumberland Head

Most runs employ at least two double-ended diesel ferries, making the crossings in opposite directions. All ferries are capable of carrying large trucks as well as cars, bicycles, and foot passengers and are of a roll-on, roll-off design (although they can operate single-ended in the event of an engine failure). Credit cards are not accepted on some routes.  Under the terms of the Maritime Transportation Security Act, vehicles and luggage brought on board some LCT vessels may be subject to search. Most runs are considered quite scenic.

During the summer, the company also provides dinner cruises and charters from Burlington as well as special runs that allow the watching of the Independence Day fireworks display at the Burlington waterfront.

Charlotte–Essex
The Charlotte–Essex ferry is run year-round, but may not operate if there is heavy icing on the lake. This became a year-round route in 1998 and has operated year-round all but two winters since.

Until the 1920s when the Champlain Bridge was built, this was the primary route for cross-lake travel.

Burlington–Port Kent
The Burlington–Port Kent ferry crosses the maximum width of the lake and does not operate in the winter. This crossing takes approximately one hour.

Park-and-ride service is available on both ends.  Snack/ice cream/gift shop vending available.

Grand Isle–Plattsburgh
The Grand Isle–Plattsburgh ferry is an ice-breaking route and provides 24-hour service year-round. The crossing on this route takes approximately 12 minutes.  In 2001, the company spoke out against a proposed plan to build a bridge that would replace this route.

Crown Point–Chimney Point

In addition, a temporary ferry operated by the company, for free at the expense of the states of New York and Vermont at a cost to the states of about $10 per car, temporarily operated from Crown Point, New York, to Chimney Point, Vermont. This 20 minute crossing operated 24-hours per day due to the removal of the Champlain Bridge due to structural problems  and the construction of a new span.

With the opening of the new Lake Champlain Bridge, this ferry crossing was no longer needed so the service ended as of November 7, 2011.

The ferries used by the LCTC 

Ferries used by the Lake Champlain Transportation Company, including six vessels that can run in ice:
 The Adirondack (the oldest, in-service, double-ended ferryboat of all time, built 1913, named after the Adirondack Mountains)
 The Champlain (built 1930; also doubles as a charter cruise boat for large groups under the brand "Lake Champlain Cruises" )
 The Evans Wadhams Wolcott (built 1988 to run in ice; the "EWW", pronounced "E, double-U, double-U" and named after Lewis P. Evans Jr., Richard H. Wadhams and James G. Wolcott, the founders of the modern company)
 The Governor George D. Aiken (built 1975; named after the former governor of Vermont and U.S. Senator)
 The Northern Lights (built 2002 to resemble the steamer Ticonderoga; used for public scenic and charter cruises under the brand "Lake Champlain Cruises.")
 The Plattsburgh (built 1984 to run in the ice; named after Plattsburgh, New York)
 The Valcour (built 1947 from WWII surplus; named after Valcour Island, site of a military battle; this vessel was the last ferry to be built on Lake Champlain and was constructed at the historic Shelburne Shipyard)
 The Vermont (built 1992 to run in ice)
 The Cumberland (built 2000 to run in ice; named for Cumberland Head, the specific location of the Plattsburgh ferry slip)
 The Raymond C. Pecor Jr.,(built 2010) named for Raymond Pecor who ran the company from 1976 to 2004, father of Trey Pecor (aka Raymond Pecor III), the company's current president. (Raymond Pecor is also the owner of the Vermont Lake Monsters, a minor league baseball team headquartered in Burlington.)

American Recovery and Reinvestment Act of 2009 grants totalling approximately $600,000 were used under the National Clean Diesel Funding Assistance Program to reduce emissions by the ferries.

History 
From about 1820 to 1850, approximately five horse ferry crossings operated on Lake Champlain.

The Burlington Bay Horse Ferry shipwreck discovered in 1983 in Lake Champlain is an example of a turntable team boat. "Horse-powered ferries like the one sunk in the Bay of Burlington, Vermont, had reached their heyday in the 1830s and 1840s. Eventually, in the 1850s, the steam boat took over and the days of horse-powered ferries quickly came to an end."

A brief history of the vessels owned by the Lake Champlain Transportation Co. from 1948–2010 is available online.

Ice-breaking on Lake Champlain 

During the winter, Lake Champlain sometimes ices over, making ferry service on the long Burlington-Port Kent route impractical. The Grand Isle-Cumberland Head route is short enough to maintain an open channel, and the distance to the Rouses Point bridge makes it practical for substantial motor traffic to use the ferry, justifying the difficulty of keeping the ferry service operating. The ferries used on this run are of the ice-breaking type; their hulls and propellers are reinforced to allow the boats to operate through thin or broken ice. By operating continuously, the ferries maintain an open channel throughout the winter ice season.

In the past, the ferries did not operate around the clock, but in winter time, a few runs were made through the night to prevent the ice from freezing solidly. Now, scheduled runs continue throughout the night.

Charitable donations 
Lake Champlain Transportation is the largest contributor to the Pecor Family Foundation, contributing over $250,000 in  the tax years 2006–2008. The foundation makes large contributions to such charities as the American Cancer Society and United Way, and to educational institutions such as the University of Vermont and Champlain College.

See also
List of icebreakers
Maritime Transportation Security Act

References

 Lake Champlain Ferryboats,

External links 

 
 All-winter Essex Ferry service critical by Mac MacDevitt and Andy Buchanan, Press-Republican, November 28, 2010.

American companies established in 1826
Ferry companies of New York (state)
Ferry companies of Vermont
Icebreakers of the United States
Tourism in New York (state)
Tourism in Vermont
Transportation in New England
Transportation in Essex County, New York
Transportation in Chittenden County, Vermont
Transportation in Grand Isle County, Vermont
Transportation in Addison County, Vermont
Transportation in Clinton County, New York
Tourist attractions in Essex County, New York
1826 establishments in Vermont
Transport companies established in 1826